Count (later Prince) Andrey Kirillovich Razumovsky (2 November 1752 – 23 September 1836) was a Russian Imperial diplomat who spent many years of his life in Vienna. His name is transliterated differently in different English sources, including spellings Razumovsky, Rasumofsky, and Rasoumoffsky.

Life
He was also a nephew of the Tsarina's lover, Aleksey Grigorievich Razumovsky, called the "Night Emperor" of Russia. The elder Rasumovsky's late Baroque palace on the Nevsky Prospekt is a minor landmark in Saint Petersburg. In 1792 Andrey Kirillovitch was appointed the Tsar's diplomatic representative to the Habsburg court in Vienna, one of the crucial diplomatic posts during the Napoleonic era.
In 1779 Razumovsky became the first Russian ambassador in the Kingdom of Naples.
He was a chief negotiator during the Congress of Vienna that re-organised Europe in 1814, and asserted Russian rights in Poland.

In 1808 he established a house string quartet consisting of Ignaz Schuppanzigh, Louis Sina, Franz Weiss, and Joseph Linke. Razumovsky was an accomplished amateur violinist, and also known as a competent torban (see also: theorbo) player. The Kunsthistorisches Museum in Vienna holds one of the four torbans known to have been in his possession. His commissioning three string quartets from Beethoven in 1806 was the act that has made his name familiar. He asked Beethoven to include a Russian theme in each quartet: Beethoven included such kind of themes in the first two.
Razumovsky was the brother-in-law of another of Beethoven's patrons, Prince Joseph Franz von Lobkowitz. His first wife, Countess Elisabeth von Thun was a sister in law of Count Carl von Lichnowsky.

The Palais Rasumofsky 

Razumovsky built a magnificent Neoclassic palace worthy of the representative of Alexander I, at his own expense and to the designs of Louis Montoyer, on the Landstraße, quite close to Vienna, and filled it with antiquities and modern works of art. In the morning of 31 December 1814, during the preparation of a ball with the Tsar Alexander I as guest of honor, a fire broke out in a temporary ballroom extension, setting the ballroom ablaze and burning out roomfuls of art in the back wing of the palace.  Even though he was raised to Prince the following year, Razumovsky was never the same. He lived in seclusion in Vienna until his death in 1836. In 1862 the street on which Razumovsky's palace is located was named Rasumofskygasse.

Conversion to Roman Catholicism

Razumovsky converted to Roman Catholicism from his native religion, Russian Orthodoxy, under the influence of his second wife, the Countess Konstanze von Thürheim (1785–1867), whom he married in February 1816.

Andrey Razumovsky Musical Fest 

On October 22, 2015 a long-awaited musical event - Andrey Razumovsky IV Regional musical festival-competition of young performers took place in Hetman Razumovsky Palace in Baturin. This tradition started in 2012 in Baturin palace at the time of the 260 birthday anniversary of Andrey Razumovsky. He is world-known for his role as patron of Ludwig van Beethoven who dedicated three String Quartets, Op. 59 1, 2 and 3, as well as the 5th and the 6th Symphonies to him.

See also 
 Razumovsky, about his family
 Naryshkin, about his family
 Galitzine, about another Russian prince and patron of Beethoven

Notes

References

External links
 Zerkalo Nedeli (Mirror Weekly) № 38, 1996 (in Russian)
 Portrait of Andrey Kyrillovich Razumovsky, aged 24, in the National Gallery of Victoria (Melbourne, Australia) The evolution of the three Partitions of Poland during the end of the 18th century, leading to some 125 years of Polish political eclipse of the formerly secular powerful Lithuanian-Polish Kingdom until 1918 can be seen in the well informed page:
 website of NHCP "Hetman's capital" (in Ukrainian)

1752 births
1836 deaths
People from Hlukhiv
Ukrainian people in the Russian Empire
Ambassadors of the Russian Empire to Austria
Active Privy Councillors, 1st class (Russian Empire)
American classical musicians
Converts to Roman Catholicism from Eastern Orthodoxy
Former Russian Orthodox Christians
Andrey
Russian Roman Catholics
Politicians of the Russian Empire
Torbanists
Ambassadors of the Russian Empire to Denmark
R